Serhiy Nakhmanovych Shefir (born 25 May 1964) is a Ukrainian politician and film director. He is the founder of Quarter-95 Studio. Since 25 May 2019 he is the First Assistant to the President of Ukraine, Volodymyr Zelenskyy. In September 2021 he survived an assassination attempt.

Early life

Born on 25 May 1964 in Kryvyi Rih, he graduated from the Kryvyi Rih Mining Institute.

Later, together with his brother Boris Shefir, he created scripts for KVN teams: "Minsk", "Makhachkala tramps", "Zaporozhye-Kryvyi Rih-Transit" (CIS Champion), "95th quarter", "95th quarter", "XX century team", "XXI century team".

In the status of director, producer, screenwriter, he participated in the "Kryvyi Rih Spaniard" and "Zaporozhye-Kryvyi Rih-Transit" teams.

Film career

He was screenwriter and producer of more than a dozen films and series. The films Love in the Big City 3, Rzhevsky Versus Napoleon and 8 First Dates were included in the list of 10 highest-grossing films in the history of Ukraine, according to Strana.ua. The film "I'll be there" received the main prize of the Kinotavr festival.

Together with his brother Boris, he was the producer of the TV series Servant of the People and Matchmakers, which were recognized by VTsIOM as leaders in show ratings.

Assassination attempt

On 21 May 2019 he was appointed First Assistant to the 6th President of Ukraine, Volodymyr Zelenskyy. On 22 September 2021, at about 10:00 am Kyiv Time, near the village of Lesniki in Kyiv, Shefir's car was fired upon. 18 bullets hit the car; the driver was wounded. Shefir himself was not injured. 

The Prosecutor General of Ukraine, Iryna Venediktova, announced that proceedings had been launched with preliminary qualification under the article "attempted murder of two or more persons". 

After the incident, Zelenskyy recorded a video message, saying that he did not know who was behind the assassination attempt on his first assistant, but promised a “strong response”.

References 

Politicians from Kryvyi Rih
Ukrainian film directors
1964 births
Living people